Aechmea aquilega is a plant species in the genus Aechmea. This species is native to Brazil, Venezuela, the Guianas, Trinidad, Jamaica and Costa Rica.

Infraspecifics
Varieties
 Aechmea aquilega var. chrysocoma (Baker) L.B.Sm.

Cultivars
 Aechmea 'Exotica Mystique'
 Aechmea 'Isabel D'Bellard'
 Aechmea 'Tropica']]
 × Portemea 'Phat Pat'

References

BSI Cultivar Registry Retrieved 11 October 2009

aquilega
Flora of South America
Flora of Costa Rica
Flora of the Caribbean
Plants described in 1806
Flora without expected TNC conservation status